Hayley Stockman (born 15 December 1985) is a New Zealand netball player in the ANZ Championship who played for the Canterbury Tactix.

References
Canterbury Tactix profile

1985 births
Living people
New Zealand netball players
Mainland Tactix players
ANZ Championship players
Waikato Bay of Plenty Magic players